Frédéric Chopin's Nocturne No. 21 in C minor, B. 108, WN 68, is a musical work for solo piano composed in 1847-1848. It was the last of Chopin's nocturnes to be published, and was done so posthumously in 1938. It is famous for its striking simplicity and folk-like melody. Among the 21 nocturnes known to have been written by Chopin, this is one of the three that end in a minor key - the other two being No. 13 in C Minor and No. 9 in B Major.

Structure

The composition is structured as a single movement marked: Andante sostenuto

References

External links

 
1837 compositions
Compositions in C minor
Compositions by Frédéric Chopin published posthumously